Bandy Club Stroitel (} is a Russian bandy club in the Russian Bandy Super League. They play in Syktyvkar, Komi Republic at the Respublikansky Stadion. The club was founded in 1947.

At the final tournament of the 2016–17 Russian Bandy Supreme League season, with two Super League tickets held in Syktyvkar, Stroitel won and was thus eligible for promotion. After discussions as to whether or not to accept, the team opted to return to the Russian Bandy Super League in the 2017–18 season after several years in the second-tier Supreme League. In the 2016–17 season, the club adopted a new logo, replacing an old one which featured a polar bear playing bandy.

References

External links
  
 Images of the old (pre-2016) and new (2016–present) logos at rusbandy.ru
Bandysidan

Bandy clubs in Russia
Bandy clubs in the Soviet Union
Sport in the Komi Republic
Bandy clubs established in 1947
1947 establishments in Russia